Blyden is a surname. Notable people with the surname include:

 Edward Wilmot Blyden (1832–1912), Liberian educator, writer, diplomat, and politician
 Larry Blyden (1925–1975), American actor, stage producer and director, and game show host
 Marvin A. Blyden, American Virgin Islander politician
 Sylvia Blyden (born 1971), Sierra Leonean journalist